New Flat is an album by The Nits. It was released in 1980 by Columbia Records.

Track listing

All tracks written by Henk Hofstede (HH) and Michiel Peters (MP).

New Flat – 2:45 (HH)
Holiday on Ice – 3:00 (HH)
Saragossa – 2:29 (MP)
Office at Night – 3:07 (HH)
Uncle on Mars – 3:52 (HH)
Statue – 3:18 (MP)
His First Object – 2:21 (HH)
Different Kitchen – 3:35 (HH)
Safety in Numbers – 3:12 (MP)
Bobby Solo – 2:09 (HH)
Zebra – 2:09 (MP)
Rubber Gloves – 2:34 (MP)
Bite Better Bark – 2:59 (HH)
Aloha Drums – 3:06 (MP)

Personnel

The band

 Michiel Peters – vocals, guitar
 Alex Roelofs – bass, keyboards
 Henk Hofstede – vocals, keyboards
 Rob Kloet – drums
 Paul Telman – engineer
 Hans Schot – light

Additional musicians

 Aad Link – trumpet
 Robert Jan Stips – mouth organ

Technical staff

 Aad Link – engineer
 Robert Jan Stips – producer
 The Nits – producers
 Aad Link – mixing (Soundpush Blaricum)
 John Sonneveld – mixing (DMC Baarn)
 Robin Freeman – mixing (Relight)

Miscellaneous

 The Nits – arrangements
 Soss Music - publishing
 Joep Bruinje – photography
 The Nits – lay-out

References

1980 albums
Nits (band) albums
Columbia Records albums